is a Japanese professional shogi player, ranked 5-dan.

Early life and education
Komori was born on August 20, 1995, in Takatsuki, Osaka Prefecture. He learned how to play shogi from his father when he was a second-grade elementary school student.

In September 2008, Komori was accepted into the Japan Shogi Association (JSA) apprentice school under the guidance of shogi professional Kenji Kobayashi at the rank of 6-kyū. He was promoted to the rank of apprentice professional 3-dan in 2016, and obtained full professional status and the corresponding rank of 4-dan in October 2017 after finishing second in the 61st 3-dan League (April 2017September 2017) with a record of 12 wins and 6 losses.

Komori is a graduate of Kobe University. He received his degree in economics from the school in the Spring of 2018.

Promotion history
The promotion for Komori is as follows:
 6-kyū: September 2008 
 3-dan: October 2016 
 4-dan: October 1, 2017
 5-dan: March 5, 2020

References

External links
 ShogiHub: Professional Player Info · Komori, Yuta

Japanese shogi players
Living people
Professional shogi players
Kobe University alumni
Professional shogi players from Osaka Prefecture
People from Takatsuki, Osaka
1995 births